Oxford United F.C. season 2011–12 was the club's second season in League Two after returning from the Conference. It was the club's 118th year in existence, their 112th of competitive football and their 63rd since turning professional. This article covers the period from 1 July 2011 to 30 June 2012.

After consolidation of the club's newly regained League status the season before (Oxford had finished 12th in League Two in 2010–11), and an unbeaten pre-season campaign that included victories over higher-division opposition in the shape of MK Dons and Birmingham City, hopes for the new season were high, but United started with an away defeat to Rotherham United on the opening day. Results improved, however, and the club briefly reached the automatic promotion places in October. They spent most of the remainder of the season in the playoff places, but a seven-match winless streak at the end of the season meant they finished outside of the playoffs in 9th place, a pattern that was to be repeated for the following two seasons under manager Chris Wilder. Doing the double (victories home and away) over local rivals Swindon Town, the eventual League champions, for the first time since 1973 offered some consolation to the Oxford United faithful. A long-range goal from midfielder Peter Leven in a home victory over Port Vale in October was another highlight of the season.

United were eliminated in the first round of both major cup competitions by higher-division opposition: League One side Sheffield United in the FA Cup and Cardiff City of the Championship in the League Cup. James Constable was the club's leading scorer for the fourth consecutive season, with 11 goals, but this was to be his least prolific season at the club.

Team kit
This season's team kit supplier is the American brand Nike, via JustSport, with this season being the third in a three-year deal.
The club's main sponsor for the 2011–12 season is Bridle Insurance, an Oxfordshire-based insurance company.

Match fixtures and results

Pre-season friendlies

July

League Two
For more information on this season's Football League Two, see 2011–12 Football League Two. Oxford United's home games are played at the Kassam Stadium

Results

August

September

October

November

December

January

February

March

April

May

Results summary

Results by round

League table

FA Cup

Football League Cup

Football League Trophy

Oxfordshire Senior Cup

Squad statistics

Appearances and goals

|-
|colspan="14"|Players no longer at the club:

|-
|colspan="14"|Loan players no longer at the club:

|}

Top scorers

Disciplinary record

Transfers

References

2011-12
2011–12 Football League Two by team